Esanthelphusa nani is a species of crab of the family Gecarcinucidae. Esanthelphusa nani lives in rice paddy fields.

References

Crustaceans described in 1984
Fauna of Southeast Asia
Gecarcinucidae